The following is a list of major terrorist attacks and arrests that have been connected to or have been claimed in reliable sources to be inspired by the Islamic State (IS), also known by other names.

Between June 2014, when the group self-proclaimed itself to be the Islamic State, and February 2018, IS has often made claims of responsibility over 140 terrorist attacks in 29 countries outside Syria and Iraq, that were "conducted or inspired" by the group, while the evidences of those claims are not verified. Hundreds of other attacks were also carried out since 2018.

The provided list below is according to a running count kept by CNN.

2013

2014

2015

2016

2017

2018

2019

2020

2021

2022

See also
List of Islamist terrorist attacks
List of terrorist incidents, 2014
List of terrorist incidents, 2015
List of wars and battles involving ISIL
List of the terrorist actions against the Mourning of Muharram

References

External links

Terrorist incidents connected to the Islamic State of Iraq and the Levant
Islamic State of Iraq and the Levant
ISIL terrorist incidents
Terrorist incidents by perpetrator